Vazh-Pashnya is a rural locality (a village) in Beloyevskoye Rural Settlement, Kudymkarsky District, Perm Krai, Russia. The population was 82 as of 2010.

Geography 
Vazh-Pashnya is located 40 km northwest of Kudymkar (the district's administrative centre) by road. Kuva is the nearest rural locality.

References 

Rural localities in Kudymkarsky District